The Alliance of Canadian Cinema, Television and Radio Artists (ACTRA) is a Canadian trade union representing performers in English-language media.  It has 25,000 members working in film, television, radio, and all other recorded media. The organization negotiates, safeguards, and promotes the professional rights of its members. It also works to increase work opportunities for its members and lobbies for policy changes at the municipal, provincial, and federal levels.

ACTRA's regional chapters present ACTRA Awards to honour the best in Canadian radio and television performances in their local productions.

Affiliations
ACTRA is affiliated with the Canadian Labour Congress and the International Federation of Actors.

In July 2005, ACTRA and the United Steelworkers announced that the two unions have entered into a strategic alliance to take on the globalization of the culture industry and to address a range of common issues.

ACTRA participated in the Faster, Together campaign to increase acceptance of COVID-19 vaccines.

Acronym Meaning 
The earliest form of the organization represented radio performers in Toronto in the 1940s.  This organization was called RATS: the Radio Artists of Toronto Society.  In 1943, with the wider involvement of groups from other Canadian cities, the Association of Canadian Radio Artists (ACRA) was formed.

ACRA over time evolved into the Association of Canadian Radio and Television Artists, the Canadian Council of Authors and Artists, the Association of Canadian Television and Radio Artists, and, in 1984, the Alliance of Canadian Cinema, Television and Radio Artists.

Union of British Columbia Performers 
Regional issues led to the creation of the Union of British Columbia Performers, a separate subunit of ACTRA for British Columbia only.

ACTRA Awards
Every year, ACTRA branches across the country present the ACTRA Awards, some of which are handed out for performances, while others are given for union activism and contributions to the industry.

ACTRA Fraternal Benefit Society
The ACTRA Fraternal Benefit Society (AFBS), a member of American Fraternal Alliance, is a "not-for-profit, member-owned, federally incorporated insurance company", founded in 1959. In 2010, Marie Charette-Poulin sat on the board of Governors of the ACTRA Fraternal Benefit Society.

HAVEN Helpline
On 1 June 2019, ACTRA and the Directors Guild of Canada jointly launched HAVEN Helpline for members in Canada, with 24-7 support, out-sourced from Morneau Shepell, with additional financial support from AFBS and Telefilm Canada.

Notable members 
ACTRA is composed of professional actors, models (video only), singers, stunt performers, and other television and radio performers.  Notable members include:
 
 Rachel McAdams
 Simu Liu
 Paul Sun-Hyung Lee
 Eugene Levy
 Dan Levy
 Andrea Bang
 Jean Yoon
 Nicole Power
 Andrew Phung
 Meredith MacNeill
 Aurora Browne
 Carolyn Taylor
 Jennifer Whalen
 Catherine Reitman
 Dani Kind
 Olunike Adeliyi
 William Shatner
 Ryan Belleville
 Amybeth McNulty
 R. H. Thomson
 Ryan Gosling
 Ryan Reynolds
 Jim Carrey
 Michael J. Fox
 Chase Tang
 Seth Rogen
 Colin Mochrie
 Ryan Stiles
 Drew Carey
 Wayne Brady
 Dale Goldhawk

See also 

 SAG-AFTRA – similar US organization for motion picture, television and radio actors
 Union des artistes – ACTRA's francophone equivalent
 ANDA - similar Mexican organization

References

Further reading

External links
 
 Alliance of Canadian Cinema, Television and Radio Artists fonds (R3600) at Library and Archives Canada

1943 establishments in Ontario
Actors' trade unions
Canadian Labour Congress
Entertainment industry unions
Organizations based in Toronto
Trade unions established in 1943
Trade unions in Canada